Tex Willer is the main fictional character of the Italian comics series Tex, created by writer Gian Luigi Bonelli and illustrator Aurelio Galleppini, and first published in Italy on 30 September 1948. It is among the most popular characters of Italian comics, with translations to numerous languages all around the world. The author took inspiration from Sardinia, where he grew up as a kid. The fan base in Brazil is especially large, but it is very popular also in Finland, Norway, Greece, Turkey, Croatia, France, India, Serbia, Bosnia, Israel and Spain.
 
The Tex Willer series is an Italian-made interpretation of the American Old West, inspired by the classical characters and stories of old American Western movies.

Tex is depicted as a tough guy with a strong personal sense of justice, who becomes a ranger (even if living in Arizona) and defends Native Americans and any other honest character from exaction and greed of bandits, unscrupulous merchants and corrupt politicians and tycoons.

Native Americans are portrayed in a complex way, emphasizing positive and negative aspects of their culture. The same can be said of the American authorities, like the U.S. Army, the politicians, the business-men, the sheriffs or the Bureau of Indian Affairs. Tex had a son, named Kit (who became a ranger too), with a Native American woman, named Lilyth, the daughter of a Navajo Chief (she later died of smallpox). Later, Tex himself went on to become the Chief of the Navajo tribe.

Tex is not only featured in a monthly comic book series, but also in a special series called Tex Albo Speciale (sometimes called Texone, meaning big Tex, because of their bigger size). The Texone have around 240 pages and some artists known outside the Tex universe have been involved, like Jordi Bernet, Joe Kubert and Ivo Milazzo.

Fictional character background
Tex Willer's first adventure appeared on 30 September 1948, as a comic strip. The "first" Tex is an unwillingly outlawed man with a strong code of honour: to kill only for self-defence. Almost immediately, however, Tex becomes a ranger. Thanks to the marriage with the beautiful Navajo girl Lilyth, he becomes Chief of the Navajos, known as Eagle of the Night, and a defender of Native American rights. Tough, loyal, infallible with guns, enemy of prejudice and discrimination, Tex is very quick and smart, and has a marked disregard for strict rules; on the other side, he has no pity for criminals, of every race and census, nor regard for their rights, if they do not immediately cooperate with the law.

Tex's closest friend in almost every adventure, since he became a ranger, is Kit Carson, loosely inspired by the historic figure of the same name. A main role has been held by Tex Willer's son, Kit Willer, and by the Navajo warrior Tiger Jack; though importance of last two has been diminishing in recent stories. Other recurring characters include El Morisco (a kind of warlock-scientist of Egyptian origin, living in the north-east of Mexico), the Mexican Montales (originally a bandido that fought against a corrupted government, and after a successful politician), the Canadian trapper Gros-Jean, the Irish boxer Pat Mac Ryan, the Mounties Colonel Jim Brandon, San Francisco Police Department Captain Tom Devlin, the Apache chief Cochise, and the Navajo wizard Red Cloud.

Tex Willer's nemesis is Mefisto, an evil magician and illusionist. Other enemies include Yama (Mefisto's son), The Black Tiger (a Malay prince who hates the white race and wants its annihilation in the United States), and Proteus (able to shapeshift his own face, and impersonate other people).

During the American Civil War Tex fought for the Union, although his home state, Texas, sided with the Confederacy. He participated in the battle of Glorieta Pass and briefly served in the 7th Regiment Kansas Volunteer Cavalry.

Characters

Main characters
Tex Willer, the protagonist, Texas ranger, chief of the Navajo tribe and also the Bureau of Indian Affairs agent of the Navajo Reservation (Tex Willer is modeled after actor Gary Cooper)
Kit Carson, Tex's best friend and pard ranger (he is not the same historical Kit Carson)
Kit Willer, Tex's son
Tiger Jack, Navajo warrior

Recurring friends and allies
Montales, former Mexican bandido and current governor of the state of Chihuahua and vice-president of Mexico
El Morisco (Ahmed Jamal), a warlock, scientist, naturalist and doctor from Memphis, Egypt, who lives in Pilares, Mexico
Gros-Jean, Canadian metis, former outlaw and current trapper working in Canada
Jim Brandon, Colonel of the Royal Canadian Mounted Police in Canada
Cochise, chief of the Apache Chiricahua tribe
Tom Devlin, Police captain in San Francisco, California
Pat MacRyan, an Irish boxer
Lefty Potrero, owner of a gym and health club in San Francisco
Nat MacKennet, sheriff in New Orleans
Ely Parker, head of the Federal Commission on Indian Affairs from 1869 to 1871
Ulysses S. Grant, General of the US Army and President of the United States from 1869 to 1877
Red Cloud, Navajo shaman

Recurring enemies
Mefisto (Steve Dickart), a powerful and evil warlock and illusionist, Tex's nemesis
Yama (Blacky Dickart), a powerful warlock, son of Mefisto. Seen four times so far
Proteus (Perry Drayton), a man who can camouflage himself and change appearance with ease
El Muerto (Paco Ordoñez), a Mexican pistolero, one of three brothers, who were killed by Tex
The Black Tiger (Prince Sumankan), a Malay prince from Borneo. Killed by Tom Devlin
The Master (Andrew Liddell), a mad scientist

Authors 

Giancarlo Berardi
Gian Luigi Bonelli
Sergio Bonelli
Mauro Boselli

Decio Canzio
Tito Faraci
Gianfranco Manfredi
Michele Medda

Claudio Nizzi
Pasquale Ruju
Antonio Segura

Illustrators

Jordi Bernet
Jesús Blasco
Guido Buzzelli
Renzo Calegari
Aldo Capitanio
Raul and Gianluca Cestaro
Fabio Civitelli
Franco Crivelli
Víctor de la Fuente
Pasquale Del Vecchio
Raffaele Della Monica
Roberto Diso
Lucio Filuppucci
Alfonso Font

Fernando Fusco
Aurelio Galleppini
Francesco Gamba
Ernesto García Seijas
Alarico Gattia
Alberto Giolitti
Joe Kubert
Guglielmo Letteri
Carlo Raffaele Marcello
Ivo Milazzo
 Vincenzo Monti
Virgilio Muzzi
Erio Nicolò

José Ortiz
Goran Parlov
Roberto Raviola
Miguel Angel Repetto
Rossano Rossi
Massimo Rotundo
Manfred Sommer
Erasmo Dante Spada
Giovanni Ticci
Mario Uggeri
Claudio Villa
Colin Wilson
Sergio Zaniboni

Foreign versions 

In Argentina, Tex was published in the 1950s by Editorial Abril in his weekly magazine Rayo Rojo, with the name of Colt Miller.

In Brazil, Tex has been published uninterruptedly since 1971. Currently, it is being published by Mythos Editora.

In Finland, Tex Willer was published in 1953–1965. After a break of five years, Tex Willer has been published continuously since 1971. The series is still popular and 16 numbers are published a year.

In Greece, Tex was published in the 1970s, 1980s and 2010s under three different titles.

In India, Tex was published in the 1980s by the South Indian Tamil Comics publisher, Lion comics. The series is regularly being published in Lion Comics, due to its wide popularity among the generations.

In Israel, Tex was published in the 1970s, reprinted several times since in limited editions, the latest one in 2007.

In Norway, Tex Willer has also run continuously since 1971, with from 11 to 17 numbers (each on 114 pages) issued a year.

In former Yugoslavia, Tex was published in the late 1960s, 1970s, 1980s and early 1990s, and was very popular among other Bonelli characters such as Zagor.
In the 1990s after the break-up of Yugoslavia Tex Willer starts publishing in Croatia
 Serbia and Slovenia.

In Turkey, Tex was published by a large number of publishers and it is still being published in irregular hardcover book formats. Ceylan Yayınları (1961 - 1969) (1978 - 1986), Zuhal Yayınları (1970 - 1978), Inter, Alfa Yayıncılık (1991), Galaksi Yayıncılık, Doğan/Egmont (AD, DE - 1996), Aksoy Yayınları (2000), Maceraperest (200? - ), Oğlak Yayınları are the numerous publishers who made Tex hundreds of thousands of fans in Turkish language.
	
In the United Kingdom, fourteen Tex Willer albums were published since 1971.

In the United States, Tex Willer appeared in two original books called The Four Killers and Tex: The Lonesome Rider, written by Claudio Nizzi and illustrated by American comic artist Joe Kubert; they were published by Dark Horse Comics. In 2017,  Epicenter Comics also released in the USA the story Tex: Patagonia.

Other media 
Attempts had been made to adapt Tex into a film in the late 1960s and early 1970s in Italy.  The film was eventually made in 1985 by director Duccio Tessari as Tex and the Lord of the Deep. The film was adapted from three Tex comics: El Morisco, Sierra Encantada and Il signore dell'abisso. The film was intended as a pilot for a television series, but poor critical and box office reception of the film led to no television series being produced.
 
In 1993 several Tex computer games (thirteen known ones) were released for the Amiga and IBM PC compatibles by Italian published Simulmondo. These games were only officially released in Italy and only had Italian text, which has made them quite rare and collectable by today.

See also
Morgan Kane
 For a non-exhaustive list of Italian authors, see List of comic creators
 For a non-exhaustive list of Italian comic books, see List of comic books

References

Sources

External links 

SERGIO BONELLI EDITORE official page
Unofficial info site on Tex Willer comics
 Tex Willer FAQ's
Unofficial site for Tex Willer videos

1948 comics debuts
Comics characters introduced in 1948
Fictional American Civil War veterans
Fictional characters from Texas
Fictional United States Army personnel
Italian comics adapted into films
Italian comics characters
Tex Willer
Tex Willer
Western (genre) comics
Western (genre) comics characters
Western (genre) gunfighters